The Los Angeles Metro Rail is an urban rail transit system serving Los Angeles County, California, United States. It consists of seven lines, including five light rail lines (the A, C, E, K, L lines) and two rapid transit (known locally as a subway) lines (the B and D lines) serving 99 stations. It connects with the Metro Busway bus rapid transit system (the G and J lines), the Metrolink commuter rail system, and several Amtrak lines. Metro Rail is owned and operated by the Los Angeles County Metropolitan Transportation Authority (Metro) and started service in 1990.

It has been extended significantly since that time and several further extensions are either in the works or being considered.

Los Angeles had two previous rail transit systems, the Pacific Electric Red Car and Los Angeles Railway Yellow Car lines, which operated between the late 19th century and the 1960s. The Metro Rail system uses many of their former rights-of-way, and thus can be considered their indirect successor.

Current system

Lines 
In Los Angeles Metro terminology, common with most other metro systems, a line is a named service, defined by a route and set of stations served by trains on that route. (The word does not refer to a physical rail corridor, as it does in New York City Subway nomenclature.)

Metro also uses the same line letter naming system for its Metro Busway services (which are bus rapid transit routes operating in transitways).

Seven Metro Rail lines operate in Los Angeles County:

The B and D lines follow a fully underground route, and the C Line follows a fully grade separated route. The A, E, K and L Line routes run in a mix of environments, including at-grade in an exclusive corridor, street running, elevated, and underground. 

Future system expansions are expected to use more shared light-rail tracks.

Stations 

The large majority of light rail stations are either at ground level or elevated, with some trenched or fully underground. All heavy rail (i.e. rapid transit) stations are fully underground. Future light rail lines will add more underground stations to the system.

Stations include at least two ticket vending machines, wayfinding maps, electronic message displays, and bench seating. Each station features unique artwork reflecting local culture and/or the function of transit in society.

Stations are unstaffed during regular hours. Call boxes are available at stations to allow employees at the Metro Rail Operations Control Center to assist passengers with concerns.

Metro Rail uses a proof-of-payment fare system, with Metro's fare inspectors randomly inspecting trains and stations to ensure passengers have a valid fare product on their Transit Access Pass (TAP) electronic fare card. When passengers enter a station, they encounter TAP card validators which collect fares when a customer places their card on top. Additionally, fare gates (turnstiles) connected to TAP card validators are at all underground stations, all elevated stations and some surface stations. Once passengers pass these validators or board a train, they have entered the "fare paid zone," where fare inspectors may check their TAP card to ensure they have a valid fare.

Underground stations are typically large in size with a mezzanine level for fare sales and collection above a platform level where passengers board trains.

Street-level stations are typically simpler with platforms designed with shade canopies, separated from nearby roads and sidewalks, where passengers can purchase fares and board a train.

Subway stations and tunnels are designed to resist ground shaking that could occur at a specific location, but there is no general magnitude of earthquake that the entire system is expected to withstand. The Metro Rail system has not suffered any damage due to earthquakes since its opening in 1993.

Some suburban stations have free or paid park and ride lots available and most have bike storage available.

Rolling stock 

Metro Rail maintains two distinct systems of rail: a light rail system and a subway system, which use incompatible technologies, even though they both use . Metro's subway lines are powered by third rail, whereas its light rail lines are powered by overhead catenary. Also, the two separate systems have different loading gauge, and platforms are designed to match the separate car widths.

Hours of operation 
Between the system's opening in 1990 and February 2020, Metro Rail lines ran regularly between 5:00 am and midnight, seven days a week. Limited service on particular segments was provided after midnight and before 5:00 am. On Friday and Saturday evenings, service operated until approximately 2:00 am. There was no rail service between 2:00 am and 3:30 am, except on special occasions such as New Year's Eve. Service operated every 5–10 minutes during the peak period, every 10–15 minutes during middays and during the day on weekends, and every 20 minutes during the evening until the close of service. Exact times varied from route to route.

In March 2020, the system started to adjust train frequencies in order to accommodate for restrictions that were enacted in the wake of the COVID-19 pandemic. Trains would continue to run between 5:00 am and midnight daily, with late night weekend service being removed in order to accommodate for train cleaning.

Fares and fare collection 
The standard Metro base fare applies for all trips. Fare collection is based on a partial proof-of-payment system. At least two fare machines are at each station. Fare inspectors, local police and deputy sheriffs police the system and cite individuals without proof of payment. Passengers are required to purchase a TAP card to enter stations equipped with fare gates. Passengers using a TAP card can transfer between Metro routes for free within 2 hours from the first tap.

The following table shows Metro fares, effective December 17, 2021 (in US dollars):

Transit Access Pass (TAP) and fare gates 
Metro has implemented a system of electronic fare collection using a stored value smartcard called the Transit Access Pass (TAP Card). This card was intended to simplify fare collection and reduce costs.  In 2012, paper monthly passes were phased out and replaced with the TAP Card. As of September 2013, first-time Metro riders must deposit an additional $2 (or $1 at TAP vending machines) on top of their first fare payment to obtain a reloadable TAP Card. In addition, in 2008 Metro began installing fare gates at all underground stations, all elevated stations and some surface stations. Implementation of both programs (the TAP Card and the fare gate program) has turned out to be expensive ($154 million in total, so far) and its initial rollout was problematic.

Ridership 

Taking overall track length into consideration, Metro Rail's subway lines transport 7,960 passengers per route mile, making this the fifth busiest U.S. rapid transit system on a per mile basis.

In terms of route length, Metro's light rail system is the second largest in the United States.

Security and safety 
Half of the Metro Rail's trains and stations are patrolled by the Los Angeles County Sheriff's Department under a law enforcement contract.  The Los Angeles Police Department, and Long Beach Police Department also patrol stations within their respective cities, also under contract.  The system is also monitored by security personnel through closed-circuit television cameras in Metro Rail stations and subway cars.

History 

However, from 1927 revenue shortfall caused Pacific Electric to begin replacing lightly used rail lines with buses. In 1958 the remnants of the privately owned rail and bus systems were consolidated into a government agency known as the Los Angeles Metropolitan Transit Authority or MTA. By 1963 the remaining rail lines were completely removed and replaced with bus service.

In the following decades, growing traffic congestion led to increased public support for rail transit's return. Beginning in the 1970s, a variety of factors, including environmental concerns, an increasing population and the price of gasoline led to calls for mass transit other than buses. The Los Angeles County Metropolitan Transportation Authority (LACMTA, now branded as Metro) began construction of the initial lines throughout the 1980s using revenues from a voter-approved increase in sales tax. The Blue (A) Line finally opened on July 14, 1990, some 27 years after the final streetcar line closed. Since that date, the system has been developed to its current size. The following table shows this expansion's timeline:

Planned expansion 
Metro has worked to plan and prioritize project funding and implementation.  Metro's 2009 Long Range Transportation Plan (LRTP) was developed to provide a long-term vision of transportation system development for the next 30 years. Metro worked to update the 2009 LRTP plan citing new housing trends and fiscal changes. Metro released the updated LRTP in 2020.

Beginning in 2014, Metro saw its ridership numbers begin to decline. Many explanations exist for the decline, including safety concerns, an increase in ride-hailing service usage, low-income housing opportunities drying up in L.A. because of the increase in rents, and a shortage of housing. Ridership declines also coincide with passage of AB 60, signed into law by Governor Brown in 2013, which provides for issuance of a vehicle operators license regardless of immigration status.

The fiscal changes are the passage of Measure R, a countywide incrememental sales tax increase passed by voters in 2008, provides funding for many of the highest priority projects in the LRTP.  On November 6, 2012, Metro attempted to pass Measure J, but failed as it did not reach the two-thirds majority needed to pass. In November 2016 election, Metro decided to place another sales tax on the ballot. The voters then approved Measure M, a half-cent permanent sales tax increase, to fund many local projects, including Metro Rail expansion.

In 2018, Metro approved renaming its rail lines using a letter-based scheme, similar to those in New York City. Metro recommended the opening of the refurbished A Line in 2019 as a starting point to rename the lines, and then continuing with the opening of the K line, finishing in time for the opening of the Regional Connector in 2022.

Current and priority projects 
The following rail projects have been given high priority by Metro. They all appear in the 2009 LRTP constrained plan, and all have funding earmarked from Measure R. With the passage of Measure M in 2016, Metro released an updated Long Range Transportation plan in February 2017, and released a full report in 2020, along with its Twenty-eight by '28 initiative.

Other expansion concepts 
Metro's Long Range Transportation Plan was published in 2009, and was updated by in 2020. The following proposed line/system expansions do not have funding or high priority in Metro's long-range plans. Some are listed as "strategic unfunded" in the last Long Range Transportation Plan, indicating some possibility they could be constructed should additional funding materialize. Others have been the subject of Metro Board discussion, with the possibility of future feasibility studies. (More information on each project can be found in the references.)

See also 

 Los Angeles County Metropolitan Transportation Authority
 Los Angeles Metro Rail rolling stock
 Breda A650
 Transportation in Los Angeles
 Measure R
 List of metro systems
 List of tram and light rail transit systems
 List of United States rapid transit systems by ridership
 List of United States light rail systems by ridership

References

External links 

History of the Metro Rail System
Network map (to-scale)
Google map of Metro Rail/Busway stations
Go Metro – Rail Map
Image of the underground construction of Metro Rail system in Los Angeles, California, 1989. Los Angeles Times Photographic Archive (Collection 1429). UCLA Library Special Collections, Charles E. Young Research Library, University of California, Los Angeles.

 
1990 establishments in California
Passenger rail transportation in California
Public transportation in Los Angeles County, California
Railway lines opened in 1990
Standard gauge railways in the United States
Transportation in Los Angeles
Underground rapid transit in the United States
750 V DC railway electrification